Walter Goodwin Staley, Jr. (October 20, 1932 – October 10, 2010) was an American equestrian who competed at the Olympic Summer Games 1952, 1956 and 1960. In 1952 he won a bronze medal in the three-day team event in Helsinki. He was born in St. Louis, Missouri and died in Mexico, Missouri.

References

External links 
 Walter Staley Jr.
 Three-time Olympic equestrian Walter Staley dies

1932 births
2010 deaths
American male equestrians
Equestrians at the 1952 Summer Olympics
Equestrians at the 1956 Summer Olympics
Equestrians at the 1960 Summer Olympics
Olympic bronze medalists for the United States in equestrian
Medalists at the 1952 Summer Olympics
Pan American Games medalists in equestrian
Pan American Games gold medalists for the United States
Pan American Games silver medalists for the United States
Equestrians at the 1955 Pan American Games
Equestrians at the 1959 Pan American Games
Medalists at the 1955 Pan American Games
Medalists at the 1959 Pan American Games